
Year 406 (CDVI) was a common year starting on Monday (link will display the full calendar) of the Julian calendar. At the time, it was known as the Year of the Consulship of Arcadius and Probus (or, less frequently, year 1159 Ab urbe condita). The denomination 406 for this year has been used since the early medieval period, when the Anno Domini calendar era became the prevalent method in Europe for naming years.

Events 
 By place 

 Roman Empire 
 Radagaisus is forced to retreat into the hills of Fiesole. There he tries to escape, but is captured by the Romans.

 August 23 – Radagaisus is executed; 12,000 "barbarians" are incorporated into the Roman army, or sold as slaves.
 Autumn – The remaining Roman legions in Britain decide to mutiny. The usurper Marcus is proclaimed emperor.
 The Vandals, led by Godigisel, are intercepted and defeated by the Franks under Marcomir. Godigisel is killed in battle and succeeded by his son Gunderic.
 December 31 – Vandals, Alans and Suebians cross the Rhine at Mogontiacum (modern Mainz), beginning an invasion of Gaul (traditional date, this may have occurred in 405).

 Asia 
 Faxian, Chinese traveler, arrives in India. He visits the major seats of Buddhist learning (Udyana, Peshawar, and Taxila).
 Hanzei succeeds his brother Richu, and becomes the 18th emperor of Japan.

 By topic 

 Agriculture 
 Cultivation of rye, oats, hops, and spelt (a wheat used for livestock feed) is introduced in Europe by the native Vandals, Alans, and Sciri, who also introduce a heavy wheeled plow to be used for farming.

 Religion 
 Stained glass is used for the first time in churches in Rome.

Births 
 Attila the Hun, ruler of the Hunnic Empire (approximate date) (d. 453)
 Shao Di, emperor of the Liu Song Dynasty (d. 424)

Deaths 
 August 23 – Radagaisus, Gothic king
 Alban of Mainz, priest and martyr (approximate date)
 Godigisel, king of the Vandals
 Gu Kaizhi, Chinese painter (b. c. 344)
 Zhang Tianxi, ruler of Former Liang (b. 346)

References